Norwood Creason (May 6, 1918 – September 15, 2009) was an American politician who served in the Missouri House of Representatives from 1977 to 1995.

He died on September 15, 2009, in Braymer, Missouri at age 91.

References

1918 births
2009 deaths
Democratic Party members of the Missouri House of Representatives